Hamid Oualich (born April 26, 1988, in Ouarzazate) is a French middle-distance runner.

Achievements

References
 

1988 births
Living people
French male middle-distance runners
People from Ouarzazate